

Results

Women's cross-country eliminator
UCI